Serge Silberman (1 May 1917 – 22 July 2003) was a French film producer.

Early life
Silberman was born in Łódź, then a part of the Regency Kingdom of Poland in a Jewish family.

During World War II, Silberman survived Nazi concentration camps and eventually settled in Paris.

Career
One of his first works as a film producer was Jean-Pierre Melville's 1955 film Bob the Gambler, a precursor to the French New Wave movement.

Silberman's most notable collaborations were with the surrealist film director Luis Buñuel. The pair, along with screenwriter Jean-Claude Carrière, who Silberman introduced to Buñuel, worked together on a number of films, starting with the 1964 film Diary of a Chambermaid. Silberman produced most of Buñuel's late films, including the Academy Award winner The Discreet Charm of the Bourgeoisie in 1972 and the director's last film That Obscure Object of Desire in 1977.

Silberman founded his own production company, Greenwich Film Productions, in 1966. The company was responsible for the production of over 15 films. In 1981, Silberman produced his most financially successful film, Jean-Jacques Beineix's Diva. The film was not well received in the country of its origin, France, but became a box-office hit abroad. The money gained from the movie enabled Silberman to provide funding for Akira Kurosawa's ambitious 1985 film Ran, which at the time of its making was the most expensive Japanese film ever.

Silberman was awarded an honorary César Award in 1988.

Death
He died in Paris in 2003 at the age of 86.

Selected filmography
Gibraltar (1964)
 Love in the Night (1968)

References

External links

Serge Silberman at Allmovie
Biography at fipresci.org by Ronald Bergan, originally appeared in The Guardian

1917 births
2003 deaths
French film producers
Russian Jews
César Honorary Award recipients
Filmmakers who won the Best Foreign Language Film BAFTA Award
Polish emigrants to France